Minnow Lake may refer to:

Minnow Lake (Minnesota), a lake in Clearwater County
Minnow Lake, Ontario, a residential area in Sudbury, Ontario